The history of Kyrgyz literature dates to the early 19th century, from the poems of Moldo Nïyaz to stories written in "Old Kyrgyz". It is an important facet of the culture of Kyrgyzstan. Kyrgyz literature is not only written, but also spoken, and passed down from generation to generation. Much of the literature in Kyrgyzstan is poetry.

Notable works and authors

Famous works 

 The Epic of Manas, originally called Манас дастаны
 Kojojash, a lesser epic poem
 The Day Lasts More Than a Hundred Years

Famous authors 

 Chinghiz Aitmatov
 Kasymaly Jantöshev
 Jolon Mamytov, famous for his love poems
 Alykul Osmonov
 Tugelbay Sydykbekov, the first person to receive the title, Hero of the Kyrgyz Republic
 Aaly Tokombaev
 Kasym Tynystanov

See also 

 Russian literature
 Soviet literature

References 

History of literature
Kyrgyz-language literature
Kyrgyzstani literature